Doss House is a 1933 British drama film directed by John Baxter and starring Frank Cellier, Arnold Bell and Herbert Franklyn.

It was made at Shepperton Studios as a quota quickie. In 1941 Baxter remade the film as The Common Touch

Cast
 Frank Cellier as Editor  
 Arnold Bell as Reporter  
 Herbert Franklyn as Detective 
 Mark Daly as Shoeblack  
 Edgar Driver as Catsmeat Man  
 Hubert Leslie as Murderer  
 Wilson Coleman as Strangler  
 Robert MacLachlan as Doctor

References

Bibliography
 Chibnall, Steve. Quota Quickies: The Birth of the British 'B' Film. British Film Institute, 2007.
 Low, Rachael. Filmmaking in 1930s Britain. George Allen & Unwin, 1985.
 Wood, Linda. British Films, 1927-1939. British Film Institute, 1986.

External links

1933 films
British drama films
1933 drama films
1930s English-language films
Films directed by John Baxter
Quota quickies
Films set in England
Films shot at Shepperton Studios
British black-and-white films
1930s British films